

Gauja National Park in Vidzeme is the largest national park in Latvia, with an area of 917.86 km2 running from north-east of Sigulda to south-west of Cēsis along the valley of the Gauja River, from which the park takes its name.

It was established in order to protect slightly disturbed natural areas, promote nature tourism and ensure sustainable development in the area. National park is characterized by a high biological diversity, rock outcrops and varied terrain shapes, springs, picturesque landscapes and many historical and cultural monuments from different centuries. The major part of the national park and the dominant is the old valley of the Gauja River. The valley is protected and at the same time it can be used for nature and cultural history tourism, as well as healthy recreation.

The park administration is based in Sigulda.

Area

The area of the park is 91.745 ha and it is divided into five functional zones. Nature reserves take up a rather small but at the same time very valuable part of the park and visits are prohibited to these areas. In the rest of the territory is allowed only such economic activities, which do not substantially change the historically developed structure of the landscape.

Forests take up ~47 %, almost one half of the territory. There are almost 900 plant species, 149 bird and 48 mammal species found in the territory. Since 2004 Gauja NP is a part of Natura 2000 network as a territory, which is designed for conservation of protected species and biotopes.

Tourism history has a long tradition in the Gauja NP. The first visitors were hiking in the Sigulda area with walking-sticks as far back as in the 19th century. Every year thousands of visitors are attracted by the unique landscape, the largest Devonian rock outcrops – sandstone precipices, rocks and caves, as well as monuments of culture and history, which are twined with many legends and stories.

In the national park, there are over 500 monuments of history and culture – hill forts, stone castles, churches, manors, water and windmills, as well as other archaeological, architectural and art monuments.

See also
 List of national parks in the Baltics
 The Park of Vienkoci
 Gauja Formation

References

External links

 Gauja National Park website
 Lacu miga (The bears' den) hotel and restaurant - Līgatne

National parks of Latvia
Protected areas established in 1973
Natura 2000 in Latvia
Vidzeme